Kobong was a Polish experimental metal band active in Warsaw from 1994 to 1998.

History 
The band was formed in Warsaw in 1994. Having recorded two studio albums, a self-titled debut album in 1995 and "Chmury nie było" in 1997, one of their songs was placed on the Polish soundtrack for the movie "Trainspotting". Kobong also performed during the premiere of Trainspotting in Poland (Kraków, Legnica, Warszawa, Poznań, Sopot). After the breakdown of Kobong, the musicians took up other musical projects, playing in bands such as Nyia and Samo. Bogdan Kondracki, the band's vocalist, is currently recognized as a musical producer, producing albums for artists like Monika Brodka and Ania Dąbrowska. In 2001, three original Kobong members (without Sadowski) formed the band Neuma. On 26 January 2005, Robert Sadowski  died from a heart attack.

Musical style 
Kobong's music was impulsive and original played with a highly experimental approach. The band was described as the precursor of "hard playing" in Poland, and stated that their music was influenced by bands such as Meshuggah.

Discography 
1995: Kobong
1997: Chmury nie było

Band members 
Bogdan Kondracki – vocals, bass
Robert Sadowski – guitar
Wojciech Szymański – drums
Maciej Miechowicz – guitar

References 

Polish heavy metal musical groups
Musical groups established in 1994
Musical groups disestablished in 1998
Musical quartets
1994 establishments in Poland